Maye may refer to:

 Maye (surname), including a list of people with the name
Maye (singer), Venezuelan-born American singer-songwriter.
 Glen Maye, a small village on the west coast of the Isle of Man

See also

 May (surname)
 Mayes
 Mays (disambiguation)